As of   , there are  member states of the United Nations (UN), each of which is a member of the United Nations General Assembly.

The following is a list of United Nations member states arranged in chronological order according to their dates of admission (with the United Nations Security Council resolutions that recommended their admission and the United Nations General Assembly resolutions that admitted them, signified with SCR and GAR, respectively), including former members. Members denoted with "→" changed their names, had their memberships in the UN continued by a successor state, merged with other members, or were dissolved.

Timeline of Enlargement of the United Nations

1940s

1945 (original members)
The UN officially came into existence on 24 October 1945, after ratification of the United Nations Charter by the five permanent members of the United Nations Security Council (China, France, the Soviet Union, the United Kingdom, and the United States) and a majority of the other signatories. A total of 51 original members (or founding members) joined that year; 50 of them signed the Charter at the United Nations Conference on International Organization in San Francisco on 26 June 1945, while Poland, which was not represented at the conference, signed it on 15 October 1945.

24 October 1945
 
 Belarus (seat held by the / → renamed to // in 1991)
 ///
 
  → 
  (seat held by  Third Czechoslovak Republic  →   →  Czech and Slovak Federative Republic) → dissolved (current UN members that formerly comprised Czechoslovakia: and  
 
 
  →  (period when merged with   → 
 
 //
 / → 
 
 
  Dominion of New Zealand → 
 
 ////
  →  →  →  → 
  (Provisional Government of National Unity) →  →  → 
 /
 / (Union of Soviet Socialist Republics) → (successor state)
  →  (period when merged with   → 
 
 Ukraine (seat held by the / → renamed to / in 1991)
 
 //

25 October 1945
  → /

30 October 1945
  →  → 

31 October 1945
 

1 November 1945
 

2 November 1945
 
 

5 November 1945
 

7 November 1945
 /
  → /

9 November 1945
 /

13 November 1945
  →  Derg →  People's Democratic Republic of Ethiopia →  Transitional Government of Ethiopia → /
 

14 November 1945
  Republic of Bolivia → 

15 November 1945
 / Republic of Venezuela → /

21 November 1945
 

27 November 1945
 

10 December 1945
 

17 December 1945
 //

18 December 1945
 

21 December 1945
 /
  Kingdom of Iraq → / Iraqi Republic → / Ba'athist Iraq → //

27 December 1945

1946
19 November 1946 (all by SCR 8 and GAR 34)
  →  → /Democratic Republic of Afghanistan →  Islamic State of Afghanistan → / → 
 
 

16 December 1946
  (SCR 13, GAR 101) →

1947
30 September 1947 (all by SCR 29 and GAR 108)
  Dominion of Pakistan → 
  →  →  (unified state after merging with )

1948
19 April 1948
  Union of Burma (SCR 45, GAR 188) →  Socialist Republic of the Union of Burma →  Union of Myanmar →

1949
11 May 1949
  (SCR 69, GAR 273)

1950s

1950
28 September 1950
  (SCR 86, GAR 491)

1955
14 December 1955
(all by SCR 109 and GAR 995)
  → /
 
 // →  
  Cambodia →  →  →  → 
 / → 
 
 / (application addressed in 1947 by SCR 24) → 
 
  (application addressed in 1947 by SCR 25)
 
  → 
  →  Libyan Arab Republic →  → 
  → 
  → 
  →  → 
  → /

1956
12 November 1956
  Sudan (SCR 112, GAR 1110) →  
  (SCR 115, GAR 1111)
  (SCR 116, GAR 1112)

18 December 1956
 / (SCR 121, GAR 1113)

1957
8 March 1957
  Dominion of Ghana → // (SCR 124, GAR 1118)

17 September 1957
  (SCR 125, GAR 1134) →

1958
22 February 1958
  and  merge to become the 

12 December 1958
  (SCR 131, GAR 1325)

1960s

1960
20 September 1960
  (SCR 133, GAR 1476) →  → United Republic of Cameroon → 
  (SCR 136, GAR 1477)
  (SCR 140, GAR 1478) → 
  (SCR 141, GAR 1479)
 // (SCR 142, GAR 1480) →  → //
  (SCR 147, GAR 1481) →  People's Republic of Benin → 
  (SCR 148, GAR 1482)
  (SCR 149, GAR 1483) → 
  (SCR 150, GAR 1484) → 
  (SCR 151, GAR 1485)
  (SCR 152, GAR 1486) →  → 
  (SCR 153, GAR 1487)
  (SCR 154, GAR 1488) →  → 
 / (SCR 155, GAR 1489)

28 September 1960
  (SCR 139 and SCR 158, GAR 1490)
  (SCR 139 and SCR 159, GAR 1491)

7 October 1960
  (SCR 160, GAR 1492)

1961
27 September 1961
  (SCR 165, GAR 1623)

27 October 1961
  (SCR 166, GAR 1630) → /
 / (SCR 167, GAR 1631)

14 December 1961
  (SCR 170, GAR 1667) →  (after merging with )

1962
18 September 1962
 / (SCR 172, GAR 1748)
 // (SCR 173, GAR 1749)
  (SCR 174, GAR 1750)
  Trinidad and Tobago →  (SCR 175, GAR 1751)

8 October 1962
  (SCR 176, GAR 1754)

25 October 1962
 / (SCR 177, GAR 1758)

1963
14 May 1963
  (GAR 1872)

16 December 1963
  (SCR 185, GAR 1976)

1964
1 December 1964
 // (SCR 195, General Assembly decision)
  State of Malta →  (SCR 196, General Assembly decision)
 / (SCR 197, General Assembly decision)

1965

20 January 1965
  withdraws from the United Nations

21 September 1965
  (SCR 200, GAR 2008)
  (SCR 212, GAR 2009)
  (SCR 213, GAR 2010)

1966
20 September 1966
  (SCR 223, GAR 2133)

28 September 1966
  rejoins the United Nations

17 October 1966
  (SCR 224, GAR 2136)
 // (SCR 225, GAR 2137)

9 December 1966
  (SCR 230, GAR 2175)

1967
14 December 1967

1968
24 April 1968
  (SCR 249, GAR 2371)

24 September 1968
  (SCR 257, GAR 2376) → 

12 November 1968
  (SCR 260, GAR 2384)

1970s

1970
13 October 1970
  Dominion of Fiji →  (SCR 287, GAR 2622)

1971
21 September 1971
  (SCR 292, GAR 2751)
 // (SCR 296, GAR 2752)
  (SCR 297, GAR 2753)

7 October 1971
 / (SCR 299, GAR 2754)

25 October 1971
 China's seat at the United Nations transferred from the Republic of China to the People's Republic of China. (GAR 2758)

9 December 1971
  (SCR 304, GAR 2794)

1973
18 September 1973
  (SCR 335, GAR 3050) →  (unified state after accession of )
  (SCR 336, GAR 3051)

1974
17 September 1974
  (SCR 351, GAR 3203)
  (SCR 352, GAR 3204)
  (SCR 356, GAR 3205)

1975
16 September 1975
 / (SCR 372, GAR 3363)
  (SCR 373, GAR 3364)
 // People's Republic of Mozambique (SCR 374, GAR 3365) → 

10 October 1975
  (SCR 375, GAR 3368)

12 November 1975
  (SCR 376, GAR 3385) → // → 

4 December 1975
  (SCR 382, GAR 3413)

1976
21 September 1976
 // (SCR 394, GAR 31/1)

1 December 1976
  People's Republic of Angola (SCR 397, GAR 31/44) → 

15 December 1976
  (SCR 399, GAR 31/104) →

1977
20 September 1977
  (SCR 412, GAR 32/1)
  (SCR 413, GAR 32/2)

1978
19 September 1978
  (SCR 433, GAR 33/1)

18 December 1978
  (SCR 442, GAR 33/107)

1979
18 September 1979
 / (SCR 453, GAR 34/1)

1980s

1980
25 August 1980
  (SCR 477, GAR S-11/1)

16 September 1980
 // (SCR 464, GAR 35/1)

1981
15 September 1981
  (SCR 489, GAR 36/1)

25 September 1981
 / (SCR 491, GAR 36/3)

11 November 1981
  (SCR 492, GAR 36/26)

1983
23 September 1983
  (SCR 537, GAR 38/1)

1984
21 September 1984
  (SCR 548, GAR 39/1)

1990s

1990
23 April 1990
  (SCR 652, GAR S-18/1)

18 September 1990
  (SCR 663, GAR 45/1)

1991
24 August 1991
 / independence from the Soviet Union

17 September 1991
 / Democratic People's Republic of Korea (SCR 702, GAR 46/1)
 // Republic of Korea (SCR 702, GAR 46/1)
  (SCR 703, GAR 46/2)
  (SCR 704, GAR 46/3)
 // independence from the Soviet Union
  (SCR 709, GAR 46/4)
  (SCR 710, GAR 46/5)
 / (SCR 711, GAR 46/6)

1992
2 March 1992
 // (SCR 732, GAR 46/224)
  (SCR 735, GAR 46/227)
 / (SCR 736, GAR 46/225)
  (SCR 737, GAR 46/226)
 / (SCR 738, GAR 46/228)
  (SCR 739, GAR 46/223)
 /// (SCR 741, GAR 46/229)
  (SCR 742, GAR 46/230)
 / (SCR 744, GAR 46/231)

22 May 1992
  (SCR 753, GAR 46/238)
  (SCR 754, GAR 46/236)
  Republic of Bosnia and Herzegovina (SCR 755, GAR 46/237) → /

31 July 1992
 / (SCR 763, GAR 46/241)

1993
19 January 1993
  (SCR 800, GAR 47/222)
  (SCR 801, GAR 47/221)

8 April 1993
 / (SCR 817, GAR 47/225) → 

28 May 1993
 / (SCR 828, GAR 47/230)
  (SCR 829, GAR 47/231)

28 July 1993
  (SCR 848, GAR 47/232)

1994
15 December 1994
  (SCR 963, GAR 49/63)

1999
14 September 1999
  (SCR 1248, GAR 54/1)
  (SCR 1249, GAR 54/2)
  (SCR 1253, GAR 54/3)

2000s

2000
5 September 2000
  (SCR 1290, GAR 55/1)

1 November 2000
  (SCR 1326, GAR 55/12) →  → / (successor state)

2002
10 September 2002
  (SCR 1426, GAR 57/1)

27 September 2002
  (SCR 1414, GAR 57/3)

2006
28 June 2006
  (SCR 1691, GAR 60/264)

2010s

2011
14 July 2011
  (SCR 1999, GAR 65/308)

Summary

Below is a summary of the growth in UN membership.

See also

Enlargement of the African Union and enlargement of the European Union
Holy See of Vatican City and State of Palestine in the Palestinian territories, the two UN General Assembly non-member observer states
Sovereign Military Order of Malta
Abkhazia, Republic of Artsakh, the Republic of China on Taiwan, Kosovo, Northern Cyprus, Somaliland, South Ossetia, Transnistria, and Western Sahara's Sahrawi Arab Democratic Republic
List of sovereign states
Member states of the United Nations

Notes

References

 
United Nations
History of the United Nations
Society-related timelines